The European Competition Network (ECN) consists of the 28 competition authorities within the European Union (see below for details) and the DG Competition of the European Commission.

The ECN has no new authority and has consequently no rights over its members. The ECN merely constitutes a mechanism for an optimal allocation of cases and sets rules for the exchange of information amongst themselves.

Regulation 1/2003 is the foundation for its creation and in Article 11 and 12 sets out the principles according to which the national competition authorities and the Commission can exchange information. According to Article 33 I b) 1/2003 the Commission is allowed to set out additional rules. The Commission did this by publishing the Notice on Cooperation within the Network of Competition Authorities.

Many favour ever more uniformity in the interpretation and application of EU competition norms and the procedures to enforce them under this system. However, when there are such differences in many Member States' policy preferences and given the benefits of experimentation, in 2020 one might ask whether more diversity (within limits) might not produce a more efficient, effective and legitimate competition regime.

Members 
The following national competition authorities, together with the European Commission's DG Competition, make up the ECN:
Austria: Bundeswettbewerbsbehörde
Belgium: Ministère des Affaires économiques
Bulgaria: Комисия за Защита на Конкуренцията
Croatia: Agencija za zaštitu tržišnog natjecanja (AZTN)
Cyprus: Επιτροπή Προστασίας Ανταγωνισμού
Czech Republic: Úřad pro ochranu hospodářské soutěže
Denmark: Konkurrencestyrelsen
Estonia: Konkurentsiamet
Finland: Kilpailuvirasto
France: Conseil de la concurrence
Germany: Bundeskartellamt
Greece: Hellenic Competition Commission
Hungary: Gazdasági Versenyhivatal
Ireland: Competition Authority
Italy: Autorità Garante della Concorrenza e del Mercato
Latvia: Konkurences padome
Lithuania: Konkurencijos taryba
Luxembourg: Inspection de la concurrence
Malta: Office for Fair Trading
Netherlands: Authority for Consumers & Markets (ACM)
Poland: Urzęd Ochrony Konkurencji i Konsumentów
Portugal: Autoridade da Concorrência
Romania: Consiliul Concurentei
Slovakia: Protimonopolný úrad
Slovenia: Urad Republike Slovenije za varstvo konkurence
Spain: Tribunal de Defensa de la Competencia
Sweden: Konkurrensverket
Turkey: Rekabet Kurumu
United Kingdom: Competition and Markets Authority

See also 
 European competition law

References

External links 
 ECN homepage: http://ec.europa.eu/competition/ecn/index_en.html

Economy of the European Union